The 2000 Republican National Convention convened at the First Union Center (now the Wells Fargo Center) in Philadelphia, Pennsylvania, from July 31 to August 3, 2000. The 2000 delegates assembled at the convention nominated Texas Governor George W. Bush for president and former U.S. Secretary of Defense Richard B. "Dick" Cheney for vice president.

Political context

Bush, eldest son of the 41st president, was identified early as the party establishment's frontrunner and turned back a strong primary challenge from John McCain, a Vietnam War veteran and U.S. Senator from Arizona. At the convention, the party and campaign sought to showcase Bush's slogan of compassionate conservatism to persuade undecided voters.

Roll call vote 

Instead of holding the roll call of states on one night, the Bush campaign arranged for the voting to take place over four nights, so that Bush would eventually build up support throughout the week, culminating with Cheney's home state of Wyoming finally putting him over the top on the final night. There were few defections, despite a large contingent of delegates having been elected to support McCain, who formally released them to Bush.

The convention then voted by acclamation to make the convention nomination unanimous. Cheney's nomination as vice president had also been approved by acclamation on Wednesday night, so Cheney could address the convention later that night as the official nominee.

Cheney's acceptance speech
Cheney's convention address was the first to include sustained attacks on Vice President Al Gore, the presumptive Democratic nominee -- whereas most of the speakers who came before him criticized the vice president only briefly, or without mentioning his name. (This was part of the Bush campaign's strategy to "change the tone" in national politics by moving beyond the division and bitterness of recent partisan discourse.) Cheney, however, was given latitude to lob various direct attacks on Clinton and Gore, and even reprised a line that Gore had used in his 1992 convention address attacking the first President Bush: "It is time for them to go."

This was the first vice-presidential acceptance speech in recent memory to be held the night before the presidential nominee's address. The standard practice at the time was for both nominees to give their speeches the same night. Cheney's speech began a tradition of vice-presidential nominees headlining their own night at the convention; two weeks later, at the Democratic convention, that party's vice-presidential nominee, Joe Lieberman, also spoke on the third night as opposed to the final night.

Bush's acceptance speech
In his speech, Bush attacked the Clinton administration on defense and military topics, high taxes, underfunded schools, high pollution, and a lack of dignity and respect for the presidency. He attacked Clinton's military policies, claiming that American troops were "not ready for duty, sir." He also claimed the Clinton administration had failed to provide leadership, saying, "They've had their chance. They have not led. We will."

Speakers

July 31
Colin Powell, former Chairman of the Joint Chiefs of Staff
Elaine Chao, former president of the United Way of America married to U.S. Senator Mitch McConnell from Kentucky

August 1
John McCain, U.S. Senator from Arizona
Norman Schwarzkopf, Jr., retired general and allied commander during the 1991 Persian Gulf War
Bob Dole, former U.S. Senator from Kansas and 1996 Republican Presidential Nominee
George Pataki, Governor of New York
Condoleezza Rice, professor of political science and former provost of Stanford University
Laura Bush, school librarian married to George W. Bush
Elizabeth Dole, former Secretary of Labor married to Former Republican Presidential Candidate Bob Dole.

August 2
Lynne Cheney, former chair of the National Endowment for the Humanities married to Dick Cheney
Vice Presidential nominee Dick Cheney, former U.S. Secretary of Defense

August 3
Tom Ridge, governor of Pennsylvania
Presidential nominee George W. Bush, governor of Texas

Other attendees
Henry Bonilla
Barbara Bush (Former First Lady)
George H. W. Bush (Former President)
George P. Bush (Son of George W.'s brother, Jeb Bush, Governor from Florida)
Andrew Card (Former United States Secretary of Transportation)
Robert Conrad
Bo Derek
Jennifer Dunn
Gerald Ford (Former President)
Bill Frist (Senator from Tennessee)
Chuck Hagel (Senator from Nebraska)
Melissa Hart (Congresswoman from Pennsylvania)
Dennis Hastert (Speaker of the United States House of Representatives)
Dwayne Johnson (The Rock)
Lorrie Morgan (country music recording artist)
Trent Lott (Senate Majority Leader)
Sue Myrick
Jim Nicholson (RNC Chairman)
Nancy Reagan (Former First Lady)
Richard J. Riordan
Rick Schroder
Ben Stein
Connie Stevens
Tommy Thompson (Governor of Wisconsin)
Tom Patrick Waring (Editor of the Northeast Times)
J.C. Watts
Hank Williams Jr.
Bruce Willis (Actor)
Steve Young

Public reception 
In July 1999, the LGBT+ community of Philadelphia held two protests on July 29 and 30. They did this in objection to Philadelphia hosting the Republican National Convention. The protests resulted in the arrest of over 300 people.

The initial protest was not target to the Republican Party specifically, rather, it was a call to change from both Republican and Democratic parties. The protesters felt that both political parties for the most part, ignored the needs and issues surrounding the LGBT community.

See also
Republican Party presidential primaries, 2000
History of the United States Republican Party
List of Republican National Conventions
U.S. presidential nomination convention
2000 Democratic National Convention
2000 United States presidential election
George W. Bush presidential campaign, 2000

References

External links

George W. Bush's nomination acceptance speech for President at RNC (transcript) at The American Presidency Project
Republican Party platform of 2000 at The American Presidency Project
PBS Online NewsHour: Republican Convention 2000 , archive including transcripts, analysis, interviews, photographs, and streaming audio/video.
CNN AllPolitics: Republican Convention 2000, archived facts, news, speech transcripts, party platform, and links
Rocca, Mo. Report From Philly: What's Wrong With Rabble Rousing? A Correspondent For "The Daily Show with Jon Stewart" Tried His Best To Ruffle Feathers At The Convention. A Web Exclusive By Mo Rocca. Newsweek.com. Aug 14, 2000.
Video of Bush nomination acceptance speech for President at RNC (via YouTube)
Audio of Bush nomination acceptance speech for President at RNC
Video of Cheney nomination acceptance speech for Vice President at RNC (via YouTube)
Audio of Cheney nomination acceptance speech for Vice President at RNC
Transcript of Cheney nomination acceptance speech for Vice President at RNC

2000 United States presidential election
Political conventions in Philadelphia
2000
Republican National Convention 2000
2000 in Philadelphia
2000 conferences
July 2000 events in the United States
August 2000 events in the United States